The Stampacchia Gold Medal is an international prize awarded every three years by the Italian Mathematical Union (Unione Matematica Italiana - UMI {it}) together with the Ettore Majorana Foundation (Erice), in recognition of outstanding contributions to the field of Calculus of Variations and related applications. The medal, named after the Italian mathematician Guido Stampacchia, goes to a mathematician whose age does not exceed 35.

Prize Winners 
2003 Tristan Rivière (ETH Zürich)
2006 Giuseppe Mingione (University of Parma)
2009 Camillo De Lellis (University of Zurich)
2012 Ovidiu Savin (Columbia University)
2015 Alessio Figalli (The University of Texas at Austin) 
2018 Guido De Philippis (International School for Advanced Studies) 
2021 Xavier Ros-Oton (ICREA and Universitat de Barcelona)

See also

 List of mathematics awards

References

External links 
European Mathematical Society newsletter with the announcement of the 2012 Stampacchia Medal (pag. 17)
Official Site of the Italian Mathematical Union (UMI)
2015 Stampacchia Medal citation (UMI)

Awards established in 2003
Awards of the Italian Mathematical Union
Calculus of variations
Awards with age limits
Triennial events